Nordlia is a neighborhood in the city of Kristiansand in Agder county, Norway. It is a part of the Oddernes borough and the district of Søm. Nordlia is located on the eastern shore of the Topdalsfjorden at the eastern end of the Varodd Bridge in the northern part of Søm. The neighborhoods of Rona and Strømme lie to the east.

Transport
The E18 goes under Nordlia in the Haumyrhei tunnel. Nordlia is served by bus line M3 from 05 to 24 every day, night buses in the weekend and extra/direct buses in the rush hours.

References

Geography of Kristiansand
Neighbourhoods of Kristiansand